Jeff Greenwood (born May 15, 1975) is an American former snowboarder. He competed in the men's parallel giant slalom event at the 2002 Winter Olympics.

References

External links
 

1975 births
Living people
American male snowboarders
Olympic snowboarders of the United States
Snowboarders at the 2002 Winter Olympics
Sportspeople from Hartford, Connecticut
20th-century American people
21st-century American people